The Tachoni  is one of the 17 sub-tribes that form  the Luhya people of western Kenya, known for its gallant defense of the  Chetambe in 1895 when resisting British rule. Tachoni people were masters at building forts such as Chetambe, Lumboka, and Kiliboti. It was their defiance of colonialism that led to the colonial government putting the entire region occupied by the Tachoni under administration of paramount chiefs drawn from Bunyala and Wanga communities.  haring the land with the Abanyala, the Kabras, Nandi, and  Bukusu tribe. They live mainly in Webuye, Chetambe Hills, Ndivisi (of Bungoma County) Matete sub-county-Lwandeti, Maturu, Mayoyo, Lukhokho, Kiliboti, Kivaywa, Chepsai, and Lugari sub-county in Kakamega County. Most Tachoni clans living in Bungoma speak the ' Olutachoni dialect of the Luhya language, and they are subsequently often mistaken as Bukusus. They spread to Trans-Nzoia County especially around Kitale, and to Uasin Gishu County near Turbo, Eldoret. Among the Tachoni clans are Abachikha -further divided into Abakobolo, Abamuongo, Abachambai,Abamakhanga, Abacharia, and Abakabini, Abamarakalu, Abangachi -who are further divided into: Abawaila, Abakhumaya and Abawele, Abasang'alo, Abasamo, Abayumbu (mostly around Webuye), Abaluu, Abarefu,Abanyangali,  Abamuchembi, Abamakhuli, Abasioya, Abaabichu,Abacheo, Abamachina,Abaengele, Abamutama, Abakafusi, Abasonge, Abasaniaka, Abaabiya also known as Abakatumi (Abamuumbwa, Abachikolati and Abamuruli), Abakubwayi,Abakamutebi, Abakamukong, Abamweya, Abalukulu,Abawande, Abatukiika, Abachimuluku. Note that the morpheme 'aba' means 'people'.
The Abakhusia/abasamo of Kabras  are also Tachonis who speak Kikabras. Abayumbu and Abaluu are twin brothers, hence do not intermmary.

The community members trace their origin to a place called  El-Matruh, Egypt (Misri), From Egypt, the followed the Nile down into the present day Kenya.  Important areas on the Tachoni migration route include Sirikwa, which is referred to most by  scholars to link Tachoni and Kalenjin ethnic group.

It is important to note that, histiorically, the  Tachoni people were known by different names. Some of the names  include the Kitoki, Kitosh, Evekwe-those from the East, Sirikwa, and Tashone.

Circumcision
The tribe is rich in beliefs and taboos. The most elaborate cultural practice they have is circumcision.

The Tachoni practice circumcision in August of every even year. When the boys are circumcised, they go hunting in the village's forest for birds and guineafowl (likhanga), and a meal is prepared for them when they return in the evening. Most meals for initiates are rich in protein and Ugali (a staple-food across Kenya, which is called 'Obusuma' in Tachoni) in order to replace blood lost during the circumcision.

The Tachoni tribe believe in 'okhulicha' (rites of passage [the training of initiates in adult roles before they are considered to be adults]). The boys are taken to 'Esitabicha' where they are taught adult behavior. They are told secrets of the community which they are not to reveal to anyone. This is done by elderly members of the Tachoni community who have undergone the same ritual. They are taught Tachoni beliefs, philosophy, values and practices.

After the rite of passage, Okhulicha, the initiates are assigned an age set, which follow a particular order, based on the year of circumcision. The Tachoni age sets are as follows(taking into account the year of circumcision and the name of the age set): Bakolongolov1900-1910; Bakikwameti 1912–1922; Bakananachi 1924–1934; Bakinyikeu 1936–1946; Banyange 1948–1958; Bamaina 1960–1970; Bachuma 1972–1986;  Basawa1988-1998; Bakolongolo 2000–2010; and Bakikwameti 2012–2022.

The Tachoni and Bukusus share naming of age sets, but several key factors differentiate the Tachoni and Bukusu circumcision rituals. For instance, during circumcision, Tachoni boys face towards the East as they are circumcised whereas Bukusu boys face the West.

Economy
The Tachoni practice farming as well as the rearing of cattle. A few engage in business.

Politics
Notable politicians among the Tachoni include John Chikati, Nabii Nabwera- current MP for  Lugari Constitueny, Martin Wanyonyi Pepel- current MP for Webuye East Constituency, Alfred Wekesa Sambu of Webuye, Dr. Noah Wekesa of Kwanza in Trans Nzoia, long-serving Councillor & Webuye Mayor and Current Minority Leader Kakamega County Assembly - John Mweyi Ngome, Amos Kaburu[Educationist],Nabii Nabwera {Council of Governors} and John Weyusia Nanyakha (the first Mihuu Ward Member of County Assembly). Those who have died include: Johnstone Welangai - former Malava large constituency and former high commissioner of Kenya to Uganda; Joshua Mulanda Angatia, former minister for health and member of parliament for Malava constituency; Munialo Matianyi, the first Chief of Mawe Tatu and a close confidant of Alfred Wekesa Sambu; former minister of state and secretary general of KANU Burudi Nabwera, Dr Noah Wekesa - former minister for tourism and wildlife and chairman of Jubilee Party; and Professor Everret Standa - a former vice chancellor of Kenyatta University and chairman of the commission of higher education.

Peter Buruti Sifuma Namisi,Jonathan Welangai Masinde- former member of parliament for Lurambi North, & Burudi Nabwera are the legends of Tachoni politics. Don't forget Wasike Binyenya (omumwalie)as well.

Wasilwa se-Wekesa, chairman of Tachoni Cultural Society (TACUSO) is also a notable figure in Tachoni commmunity.

Dialects 
The various Luhya tribes speak several related languages and dialects, though some of them are no closer to each other than they are to neighboring non-Luhya languages. For example, the Bukusu people are ethnically Luhya, but the Bukusu dialect is a variety of Masaba. However, a core of mutually intelligible dialects comprise Luhya proper:
 Hanga (OluWanga)
 Tsotso (OluTsotso)
 Marama (OluMarama)
 Kisa (OluShisa)
 Kabras (LuKabarasi)
 East Nyala (LuNyala)

See also 
 Luhya people
 Luhya languages

References

Luhya
Tribes of Africa